The Lansdowne Symphony Orchestra is one of the oldest community orchestras in the Greater Philadelphia area, and is located in Lansdowne, Delaware County, Pennsylvania. In existence since 1945, the orchestra's season runs from October through April, performing five concerts at the Upper Darby Performing Arts Center. The Lansdowne Symphony Orchestra won The American Prize Ernst Bacon Memorial Award for the Performance of American Music, community instrumental division, 2018-19 for its première recording, American Romantics.

Music directors  
Henri Elkan, 1955–1980
Jacques Voois, 1980–1991
Irving Ludwig, 1991–2012
Reuben Blundell, 2014–present

References 

Orchestras based in Pennsylvania
Musical groups established in 1945
1945 establishments in Pennsylvania